Miloš Dragaš (born 11 June 1990) is a Serbian handball player for Romanian club Potaissa Turda and the Serbia national team.

Club career
After starting out at his hometown club Priboj, Dragaš moved across the border and played for Bosnian team Lokomotiva Brčko in the 2009–10 season. He subsequently returned to Serbia, spending two and a half years with Metaloplastika, before moving to Macedonian club Vardar in November 2012. In the 2013–14 season, Dragaš rejoined Metaloplastika, helping them reach the EHF Challenge Cup final.

In June 2014, Dragaš signed a three-year deal with Handball-Bundesliga team Bergischer HC. His contract was terminated by mutual consent on 28 December 2015. After playing for Metalurg Skopje and Hapoel Rishon LeZion, Dragaš moved to Romania and joined Székelyudvarhelyi KC in June 2017. He would also play for Minaur Baia Mare, Politehnica Timișoara and Potaissa Turda.

International career
At international level, Dragaš represented Serbia at the 2013 World Championship.

Honours
Vardar
 Macedonian Handball Super League: 2012–13
Politehnica Timișoara
 Cupa României: 2018–19

References

External links
 

1990 births
Living people
People from Priboj
Serbian male handball players
RK Metaloplastika players
RK Vardar players
Bergischer HC players
Handball-Bundesliga players
Expatriate handball players
Serbian expatriate sportspeople in Bosnia and Herzegovina
Serbian expatriate sportspeople in North Macedonia
Serbian expatriate sportspeople in Germany
Serbian expatriate sportspeople in Israel
Serbian expatriate sportspeople in Romania